Fobar is a Malagasy football club based in Toliara, Madagascar.

The team plays in the Malagasy Second Division.

In 1995 the team has won the THB Champions League.

Achievements
THB Champions League: 1
1995

Performance in CAF competitions
CAF Champions League: 1appearance
1996 African Cup of Champions Clubs

References

External links

Football clubs in Madagascar